Destiny Rogers (born September 13, 1999) is an American singer from Lodi, California. Rogers has released two extended plays: Tomboy (2019) led by the single "Tomboy" and Great Escape in May 2020.

Early life
Rogers grew up in the small town of Lodi, California. Rogers is fluent in Spanish from growing up in a Mexican household through her mother's side of the family. She learned to play guitar at the age of 10 from watching YouTube videos of Justin Bieber play. Rogers grew up in the Pentecostal church where her dad has been a worship leader for 30 years; she was active in the church community in her youth and performed in the band during church services. Rogers went to a non-traditional, independent high school so she could focus on singing and songwriting. She moved to Los Angeles in January 2019 for her music career.

Musical career
In 2017, a family friend showed Rogers' cover on YouTube to production duo The Stereotypes, which led them to working together. Rogers subsequently spent one weekend a month in Los Angeles to work on music with them for two years. She signed with their label in February 2018 and RCA Records in November. Her music influences are Justin Bieber, H.E.R., Kehlani, and Billie Eilish.

On February 28, 2019, Rogers released her debut single "Tomboy," following recording in mid-2018. Lyrically, the song is about "defying expectations" and inspiring women to be confident. A music video was filmed in Rogers' hometown with footage of her skateboarding and was released with the song. Professional skater, Mariah Duran, also flew out to appear in the video.
Rogers released her debut EP, Tomboy, produced by The Stereotypes on March 22, 2019 after recording for two years. Music videos for the EP songs "North$ide" and "Lockdown" were also released.

Rogers performed at the 2019 South by Southwest and 2019 Camp Flog Gnaw Carnival. In the fall of 2019, she opened for singer Ruel on his Free Time Tour in North America. In December 2019, Rogers participated in a songwriting camp with Alicia Keys.
On May 29, 2020, Rogers released her second EP titled Great Escape. The EP was led by singles "Kickin' Pushin'" and "Euphoria." 

Singer Lisa from K-Pop group Blackpink released a choreographed music video for "Tomboy" which boosted the song through streaming. The attention prompted Rogers to release a remix of the song with rapper Coi Leray and a new music video in April 2021. In May 2021, Rogers released a single and music video titled "West Like" featuring Kalan.FrFr and a joint single called "Got It Like That" with B.I and  Tyla Yaweh.

Rogers co-wrote the track "All or Nothing" on K-Pop singer Nayeon's debut solo project Im Nayeon released on June 24, 2022. On August 18, 2022 Rogers was featured in the remix of Thuy's song "In My Bag". Rogers appeared on James Reid's album Lovescene in the song "Lie to Me." The accompanying music video was filmed in Manila, Philippines and was released on November 16, 2022. Rogers stated near the end of 2022 that she left RCA Records.

Performances 
Destiny Rogers went on a North American tour with Australian Singer/Song-Writer Ruel in 2019. The tour began on September 19, 2019 in Brisbane, Australia and ended on November 3, 2019 in Los Angeles, California.

Destiny Rogers performed at Tyler, the Creator’s Camp Flog Gnaw Carnival which took place at Dodger Stadium in November 2019. Rogers performed at Camp Flog Gnaw alongside other artists such as Tyler, the Creator, H.E.R., Daniel Caesar and 21 Savage.

Destiny Rogers headlined the Plural Music: #AllGenresWelcome Block Party in October 2021, which took place in San Francisco, California.

Destiny Rogers performed at Staples Center for the LA Clippers opening game half-time show alongside artist Kalan Fr.Fr. in October 2021, where they performed their song “West Like.”

Destiny Rogers will be touring with American rapper, singer-songwriter Arizona Zervas for his The Road Trip Tour. She will be performing in San Francisco California, Sacramento California, San Diego California, Phoenix Arizona, Los Angeles California, and Santa Ana California. The tour begins on November 24, 2021 in Washington D.C. and ends on December 30, 2021 in Santa Ana, California.

Personal life
On National Coming Out Day in 2022, Rogers publicly came out as bisexual.

Discography

Extended plays
 Tomboy (2019)
 Great Escape (2020)

References

External links 
 
 

1999 births
Living people
21st-century American singers
American women singer-songwriters
21st-century American women singers
People from Lodi, California
Singer-songwriters from California
American musicians of Mexican descent
Hispanic and Latino American women singers